The Acting Irish International Theatre Festival (AIITF) is an annual festival of full-length Irish plays performed by Irish community theater companies from Canada, US and Ireland.  The festival was started in 1994 and is performed in a different city each year.

1994 Festival; Winnipeg
The concept of the Acting Irish International Theater Festival (AIITF) was originated by three Irish community theater groups: the Tara Players of Winnipeg, Milwaukee Irish Arts, and Na Fianna Theatre of Minneapolis-St. Paul.  These three groups held several invitational performances in each other's city between 1990–93, and all three groups participated in the 1991 Milwaukee Irish Fest. The Tara Players of Winnipeg participated in the Milwaukee Irish Fest in 1992 and 1993 as well, but because that festival was dedicated primarily to Irish music, the three groups co-founded the theater-only AIITF in 1994.  The first festival was held in Winnipeg, Manitoba, Canada March 10–13, 1994 and presented at the Tara Players' theater at the Irish Association of Manitoba.  One of the founders of the festival was Geoff White of the Tara Player of Ottawa.

1995 Festival; Minneapolis
The 1995 AIITF was held March 9–11 at the Weyerhaeuser Auditorium in Landmark Center, 75 W. 5th St., St. Paul, Minnesota, USA.  Five organizations participated, hosted by Na Fianna of Minneapolis-St. Paul.  The adjudicators were Mona Poehling, Dan Sullivan and Ethna McKiernan.

1996 Festival; Calgary
In 1996, the AIITF was held in Calgary, Alberta, Canada May 15 to 19, 1996 at the Irish Cultural Center.  The festival adjudicators were Christopher Foreman, Pat Benedict, and Dr. Richard Wall.  Six groups participated:

In addition to these formal festival productions, two "showcase" (non-adjudicated) productions were presented: Winners (from Lovers: Winners and Losers) by Brian Friel, presented by the Liffey Players of Calgary, and Bag Lady, by Frank McGuiness, presented by Patabesin Productions, Calgary.

1997 Festival; Milwaukee
In 1997, the AIITF was held in Milwaukee, Wisconsin, USA at the Scottish Rite Cathedral, 790 N. Van Buren St. May 14–17.  Adjudicators for this festival were Milwaukee actress Laura Gordon; Christopher Foreman, former artistic director of the Northern Arts and Cultural Center in Yellowknife, Northwest Territories, Canada; and Ray Yeates, who was the youngest director in the history of Dublin's Abbey Theatre.

The Best Production award in 1997 was presented to Tara Players of Winnipeg, for their production of The Field. Tadhg McMahon of the Tara Players was also presented with the Best Supporting Male award for his performance as Tadhg McCabe.

Note: The 2004 AIITF program lists the New York participant at the 1997 AIITF as the John Fitzgerald Theatre; the Milwaukee Journal Sentinel article of May 14, 1997, lists the group as the Thomas Davis Players.

1998 Festival; Winnipeg
The AIITF in 1998 returned to Winnipeg, Manitoba, and was held at the Gas Station Theatre May 13–16, 1998.  Groups from Toronto, Ottawa and Chicago joined the festival.

Productions

Awards in 1998

1999 Festival; Chicago
The Gaelic Park Players hosted the AIITF in Chicago, Illinois May 25–30, 1999.

Productions in 1999

Awards in 1999

2000 Festival; Toronto
The Toronto Irish Players, of Toronto, Ontario, Canada, hosted the AIITF in 2000. The festival included the North American debt of The Wheeping of Angles by Joseph O'Connor, brother of Sinéad O'Connor.

2000 Productions

2000 Awards

2001 Festival; Denver
In 2001, the AIITF was held in Denver, Colorado, USA, at the Courtyard Theatre, Auraria Campus, the University of Colorado Denver, on May 15–19, 2001. The festival was hosted by Tir Na nOg, whose name mean in Irish (Gaelic) "everlasting youth". A special performance by PHAMALy (Physically Handicapped Actors and Musical Artists League), as guests artists, was also presented at this festival.

The Best Production award in 2001 was presented to Innisfree Irish Theatre for their production of The Cripple of Innishmaan, by Martin McDonagh.  Sean Mac Donnchadha, of Innisfree Irish Theatre, received the acting award for Best Lead Male Actor as JohnnyPateenMike in The Cripple of Innishmaan

2002 Festival; Ottawa
The AIITF was held in the Capital of Canada, Ottawa, in 2002.

The Best Production award was presented to the Toronto Irish Players for their production of Da by Hugh Leonard

2003 Festival; Florida
Innishfree Irish Theatre hosted the 2003 AIITF at The Crest Theatre, Del Ray Beach, Florida, May 11–17, 2003.  The 2003 Festival also featured, for the first time, three groups invited from Ireland. This festival featured the first North American production of Paddy Irishman, Paddy Englishman, and Paddy. . .? by Declan Croghan.

The Best Production award was presented to the Tara Players of Winnipeg for their production of Paddy Irishman, Paddy Englishman, and Paddy. . .? James Bowman won the award for Best Actor in the same production  The Irish Players of Rochester, an invitational group at this, their first festival, were awarded "Best Invitational Production" for  Someone Who'll Watch Over Me.

2004 Festival; Winnipeg
The 2004 AIITF returned to Winnipeg for the third time, hosted by the Tara Players at the Manitoba Theatre for Young People, May 20–22, 2004.

2004 Productions

The scheduled performance of the Gaelic Park Players was canceled due to weather problems.

2004 Awards

2005 Festival; Chicago

The AIITF returned to Chicago in 2005, hosted by Gaelic Park Players at the Beverly Arts Center, 2407 W. 111th St., May 18–21, 2005.

2005 Productions

2005 Awards

2006 Festival; Toronto
The 2006 AIITF was hosted by the Toronto Irish Players at the Young Centre for the Performing Arts May 30 to June 3.  The festival was hosted by the thirty-year-old Toronto Irish Players, which performed The Plough and the Stars by Seán O'Casey, featuring nine  transplanted Dubliners in the cast.

2006 Productions

2006 Awards

2007 Festival; Milwaukee
Milwaukee Irish Arts hosted the 2007 AIITF at the University of Wisconsin in Milwaukee, May 15 to 20.

2007 Productions

Note: Starting with this festival, Innisfree Irish Theatre changed its name to the Irish Theatre of Florida.

2007 Awards

Special Adjudicator Award: Gaelic Park Players "For a very entertaining, if completely insane, romp through the upper regions of Irish lunacy, confirming the old showbiz adage of 'leave them laughing when you go.'"

Honourable Mention: Costume Design for Holding Court Theatre for their production of Summer by Hugh Leonard and also for Toronto Irish Players for their production of At the Black Pig's Dyke by Vincent Woods.

In addition to the seven adjudicated productions, the 2007 Festival included two special presentations: 
Townlands, by Dermot Bolger; a reading presented by the students of the Theater Department of the University of Wisconsin at Milwaukee.  
Sneak preview of Walking the Road, also by Dermot Bolger.  This play about Francis Ledwidge, a young Irish poet who lost his life in Flanders fields in 1917, while serving with the British army in World War I, had its world premiere at Axis Arts Center in Dublin June 9, 2007.

2008 Festival; Rochester
The Irish Players of Rochester, a program of the Rochester Community Players, hosted the 2008 AIITF at the Geva Theatre Center's NextStage Theatre May 13 to 17.  The festival included two long one-act plays by the young Dublin playwright, Conor McPherson

2008 Productions

2008 Awards

2009 Festival; Winnipeg

For the fourth time, the Tara Players of Winnipeg hosted the AIITF, in May 2009.

2009 Productions

2009 Awards

2010 Festival; Chicago
The 2010 AIITF was held May 17 to 22, 2010 at the Irish-American Heritage Center, 4626 North Knox Avenue, Chicago.

2010 Productions 
(in order or presentation)

2010 Awards

2011 Festival; Calgary
The Liffey Players Drama Society of Calgary, Alberta, Canada, hosted the 2011 Festival at the Vertigo Theatre at the base of the Calgary Tower, from May 16–21, 2011.

2011 Productions

2011 Awards

2012 Festival; Dublin
The Axis-Ballymun Theatre in Dublin, Ireland, hosted the 2012 Festival from May 14–19, 2012.

2012 Productions

2012 Awards

2013 Festival; Chicago
The Festival was hosted by Chicago's Gaelic Park Players from May 21–25, 2013. The festival took place at Chicago's Gaelic Park, 6119 West 147th Street; Oak Forest, Illinois. The adjudicator for the festival was Brad Armacost. Attending the Awards Ceremony on May 26 was Aidan Cronin, Counsel General of Ireland, Chicago, Illinois.

2013 Productions
(in order of presentation)

2013 Awards

Finalists for awards in 2013:

Best production: Doubt, a Parable; Eclipsed; Here We Are Again, Still; Beauty Queen of Leeane

Outstanding Performance by a Male Actor in a Leading Role: Robert Wall (Doubt, a Parable); Ken Moroney (Molly Sweeney); Robie Saxon (Molly Sweeney); Jack Kirwan (Here We Are Again, Still)

Outstanding Performance by a Female Actor in a Leading Role: Carol McQuarrie (Doubt, a Parable); Neasa McCann (Molly Sweeney); Imelda Wellington (Here We Are Again, Still); Sandy Lucas (Beauty Queen of Leeane)

Outstanding Performance by a Male Actor in a Supporting Role: Greg Ludek (Is Life Worth Living?); Mick McEvilley (Dancing at Lughnasa); Luke Hurt (Here We are Again, Still); Dorin McIntosh (Beauty Queen of Leanne)

Outstanding Performance by a Female Actor in a Supporting Role: Kate McNally (A Wake in the West); Kathy Dauer (Is Life Worth Living?); Megan Andres (Doubt, a Parable); The entire cast of Eclipsed

2014 Festival; Delray Beach, Florida
The Festival was hosted by the Irish Theatre of Florida from May 20–25, 2014. The festival took place at the Artns Garage, 180 NE 1st Street, Delray Beach. The adjudicator for the festival was John Countryman, Director of Theatre at Berry College in Georgia.

2014 Productions 
(in order of presentation)

2014 Awards

Nominees for awards:

Best production: Shining City' (Rochester); These Halcyon Days (Milwaukee); 'Brighton (Dublin)

Outstanding Performance by a Male Actor in a Leading Role: Eamonn O'Neill (Sean) These Halcyon Days; Jerod Blake (Jake Quinn and other characters) Stones in his Pocket; Bernard Boland (Hal) The Housekeeper

Outstanding Performance by a Female Actor in a Leading Role: Neasa McCann (Lilly) Brighton; Joan End (Patricia) These Halcyon Days; Vera Kelly (Mary Conlon) The Butterfly of Killybegs

Outstanding Performance by a Male Actor in a Supporting Role: Cathal Moroney (Dave) Brighton; Bill Alden (John) Shining City; Toby Barton (Tadhg) The Irish Dracula

Outstanding Performance by a Female Actor in a Supporting Role: Cecilia Walsh (Lucilla Desmond) The Irish Dracula; Annya Bright (Mina Murray) The Irish Dracula; Carol McQuarrie (Beth) The House Keeper

2015 Festival; Cincinnati, Ohio
The Festival was hosted by the Irish American Theater Company from May 19–24, 2015. The festival took place at the Irish Heritage Center, 3905 Eastern Avenue, Cincinnati, . The adjudicator for the festival was George Heslin, Artistic Director of Origin Theatre Company, NY.

2015 Productions
(in order of presentation)

2015 Awards

Nominees for awards:

2016 Festival; Milwaukee
The Festival was hosted by Milwaukee Irish Arts from May 24–28, 2016. The festival took place at Next Act Theatre, 255 S Water Street, Milwaukee, WI.

2016 Productions 
(in order of presentation)

2016 Awards

Finalists for awards in 2016:

Best production: Eden; The Seafarer; The Last Days of Cleopatra

Outstanding Performance by a Male Actor in a Leading Role: Jerod Blake (Eden); Denis Holmes (Hooked); Quinn Greene (Last Days of Cleopatra)

Outstanding Performance by a Female Actor in a Leading Role: Katelyn Morishita (Eden); Neasa McCann (Chapatti); Peggy Hamilton (Last Days of Cleopatra)

Outstanding Performance by a Male Actor in a Supporting Role: Dylan Bolan (The Plough and the Stars); Mark John Donahue (The Seafarer); Mick McEvilley (The Weir)

Outstanding Performance by a Female Actor in a Supporting Role: Liz Shipe  (The Plough and the Stars); Marssie Mencotti (The Cheek); Bridget Christianson (Shadow of a Gunman)

References

1994 establishments in Canada
Theatre festivals in Canada
Theatre festivals in the United States
Festivals established in 1994